Taunton Deane is a local government district with borough status in the English county of Somerset. In the United Kingdom, the term listed building refers to a building or other structure officially designated as being of special architectural, historical or cultural significance; Grade II* structures are those considered to be "particularly significant buildings of more than local interest". Listing was begun by a provision in the Town and Country Planning Act 1947. Once listed, severe restrictions are imposed on the modifications allowed to a building's structure or its fittings. In England, the authority for listing under the Planning (Listed Buildings and Conservation Areas) Act 1990 rests with Historic England, a non-departmental public body sponsored by the Department for Digital, Culture, Media and Sport; local authorities have a responsibility to regulate and enforce the planning regulations.

Taunton Deane has an area of 462 square kilometres (178 square miles), and a population as of 2016 of 115,500. It is centred on the town of Taunton, where around 60,000 of the population live and the council are based, and includes surrounding suburbs and villages.

There are 118 Grade II* listed buildings in Taunton Deane. The oldest is St George's Church, Fons George which has Saxon origins. There are also Norman  and medieval churches and churchyard crosses. More recent buildings include country houses and barns along with municipal buildings and an almshouse. The list also includes urban properties such as those in Hammet Street and The Crescent in Taunton. Industrial sites are represented by Tonedale Mills in Wellington, the largest woollen mill in South West England.

Buildings

|}

See also
 Grade II* listed buildings in Somerset
 Grade I listed buildings in Taunton Deane

Notes

References

External links

 
Lists of Grade II* listed buildings in Somerset